Thomas Jay Drury is an American writer.
 
Drury was born in Iowa, in 1956, grew up in the small town of Swaledale and received his bachelor's degree in journalism from the University of Iowa in 1980.

For the next five years, Drury worked at a series of newspapers, including the Danbury News-Times, the Litchfield County Times, and The Providence Journal until he was accepted to the graduate writing program at Brown University in 1985. After his short stories were published in Harper's Magazine, the North American Review, and The New Yorker, he was contacted by Sarah Chalfant of the Wylie Agency.

Drury's first novel, The End of Vandalism, was published in 1994 by Houghton Mifflin, and was chosen as an ALA Notable Book in 1995.

In 1996, an excerpt of Hunts in Dreams appeared in GRANTA 54, Summer 1996: The Best of Young American Novelists, published by Granta magazine. In 2000-2001 he was a recipient of the John Simon Guggenheim Foundation Fellowship.

Drury is also the author of The Black Brook (1998), Hunts in Dreams (2000), The Driftless Area (2006), and Pacific (2013) as well as works in the Mississippi Review and The New York Times Magazine. He was a writing instructor at Wesleyan University, and taught as a visiting writer at Florida State University, La Salle University, and Yale University. He also served as an editor at the St. Petersburg Times.

Drury currently lives in New York City and Berlin.

Awards and honors 

 Granta‘s Best Young American Novelists
 Best of BBC Radio’s Recent Short Fiction, “Heroin Man”
 John Simon Guggenheim Memorial Foundation Fellow

 ALA Notable Books, The End of Vandalism
 GQ‘s Best Books of Last 45 Years, The End of Vandalism
 New York Magazine Best Books, The End of Vandalism
 Publishers Weekly Best Books, The End of Vandalism
 Borders Original Voices, The Black Brook
 New York Times Notable Books, Hunts in Dreams
 New York Times Editor’s Choice, The Driftless Area
 Chicago Tribune Best Books, The Driftless Area
 San Francisco Chronicle Best Books, The Driftless Area
 MacDowell Fellowship
 National Book Awards Longlist, Pacific
 New York Times Editors' Choice, Pacific
 San Francisco Chronicle Recommended Books, Pacific
 Berlin Prize Fellowship

Bibliography
In Our state (1989)
The End of Vandalism (1994)
The Black Brook (1998)
Hunts in Dreams (2000)
The Driftless Area (2006)
Pacific (2013)

References 

1956 births
Living people
20th-century American novelists
Novelists from Iowa
University of Iowa alumni
American male journalists
Brown University alumni
21st-century American novelists
American male novelists
American male short story writers
20th-century American short story writers
21st-century American short story writers
20th-century American male writers
21st-century American male writers
20th-century American non-fiction writers
21st-century American non-fiction writers